Maryanne Dever is an Australian academic whose research focuses on feminist literary and archival studies.

Education 
Dever completed a BA (Hons) at the University of Queensland in 1984, an MA (Hons), followed by a PhD, at the University of Sydney.

Career 
She is currently Pro Vice-Chancellor (Education and Digital) at the Australian National University in Canberra. She has worked previously at the University of Technology Sydney, Monash University, the University of Hong Kong and the University of Sydney. At Monash University she was Director of the Centre for Women's Studies and Gender Research. She has held visiting positions at McGill University, the National Library of Australia, University College London and the University of Tampere. 

 Dever is joint editor-in-chief with Lisa Adkins of the academic journal, Australian Feminist Studies.

Selected works

References 

Living people
University of Queensland alumni
University of Sydney alumni
Academic staff of the Australian National University
Literary scholars
Australian editors
Year of birth missing (living people)